Sachin Baby (born 18 December 1988) is an Indian cricketer who plays for Kerala in domestic cricket.  He is a left-handed middle-order batsman and occasional right-arm off spinner.

Early life and education
Sachin was born on 18 December 1988 on Machiplavu near Adimali in Idukki district of Kerala. He was named after Sachin Tendulkar by his parents. He completed his early education from Vishwadeepthi Public School and SNDP School.

Cricket career
Sachin made his first-class debut for Kerala on 3 November 2009 in the 2009-10 Ranji Trophy. He made his List A debut for Kerala on 13 February 2011 in the 2010-11 Vijay Hazare Trophy. He made his Twenty20 debut for Kerala on 16 October 2011 in the 2011-12 Syed Mushtaq Ali Trophy.

Sachin scored heavily in the 2012–13 Vijay Hazare Trophy hitting 298 runs from seven matches with an average of 74.50. He scored his maiden List A century in the quarter-finals of the tournament, securing a place for Kerala in the final four. He represented South Zone in the 2012-13 Deodhar Trophy.

In August 2013, Sachin was named to the India A squad to play three unofficial ODIs against New Zealand A team.

Sachin was named Kerala's captain in the 2014-15 Ranji Trophy and made his maiden first-class century with an unbeaten 200 in the season. He scored a career-best score of 250 in the 2016-17 Ranji Trophy in the match against Services and was declared the man of the match.

Sachin was the captain of the Kerala team which qualified to play the quarter-finals of Ranji Trophy for the first time in the 2017-18 season. This was followed by the team's historical entry to the semi-finals of the tournament in the next season, again under his leadership.

Sachin's partnership of 338 runs with Sanju Samson in the match against Goa in the 2019-20 Vijay Hazare Trophy is the highest partnership in List-A cricket for Indian cricket and third highest in the format.

Indian Premier League
Sachin was signed by Rajasthan Royals ahead of the 2013 Indian Premier League. However, he hardly got any batting opportunities in the four matches he represented the team.

Sachin was picked by Royal Challengers Bangalore in the 2016 auction. He played 11 matches in the season, scoring just 119 runs with an average of 29.75.

In January 2018, Sachin was bought by the Sunrisers Hyderabad in the 2018 IPL auction. In February 2021, Sachin was bought again by the Royal Challengers Bangalore in the IPL auction ahead of the 2021 Indian Premier League.

Personal life
Sachin married his girlfriend Anna Chandy on 5 January 2017, at St Sebastain's Church, Thodupuzha. The couple have a son.

Sachin released the official teaser of his YouTube channel Sachin Baby Official on 15 July 2020.

References

External links
 

Living people
1988 births
Kerala cricketers
Indian cricketers
Rajasthan Royals cricketers
South Zone cricketers
People from Idukki district
Cricketers from Kerala
Royal Challengers Bangalore cricketers
Prime Doleshwar Sporting Club cricketers